The Kanata Lasers were a Junior "A" ice hockey team from Ottawa, Ontario, in Canada.  They are a part of the Central Canada Hockey League. The Lasers played their home games at The Tom Flood Arena located inside the Kanata Rec Complex in Kanata, Ontario.

Team history
The Kanata Valley Lasers began play in the Central Junior Hockey League in 1987-88 when an expansion franchise was granted to Kanata, Ontario, which was then a separate suburb of Ottawa. During their first 15 years as the Valley Lasers, the team never missed the playoffs, had the same head coach, Archie Mulligan, won 2 Art Bogart Cup championships in 1992 and 1997 won the Fred Page Cup in 1997.

In May 2002, the Kanata Sports Club sold the Kanata Valley Lasers to Dynasty Flooring Inc. The new ownership refurbished the team, renamed them the Kanata Stallions, and moved from the Jack Charron Arena to the Kanata Recreation Centre. To date, the Stallions have yet to finish in the top 5 and make the CJHL finals. In fact, in the 2004 playoffs, the Stallions upset the Cumberland Grads in seven games to advance to the semi-finals, but lost to the Nepean Raiders in six games. It was the only time to date that the Stallions made it past the first round of the playoffs. The Stallions missed the playoffs multiple times in recent years.

Kanata named former NHL player Chris Valentine as head coach for 2008-09, but was fired in October after a slow start. He was replaced with Vince Millette. The Stallions broke a CJHL record recently with a 26-game losing streak, breaking the 25 game losing streak held by the 1994-1995 Cumberland Grads.

In April 2010, it was announced that the Kanata Stallions would host the 2012 Fred Page Cup at the Kanata Recreation Centre. In the summer of 2011, head coach Adam Dewan was relieved of his duties. Randy Pierce took over the coaching helm, but was fired in February, leaving Corey Foster to replace him to finish the 2011-12 season. In March 2012, the Stallions missed the playoffs when they failed to win their last key games. Despite this, the Stallions' season was not done- being hosts, the team was given a shot at the Fred Page Cup. Battling against all odds, the Stallions were able to make the semi-finals in the tournament, only to fall to the Bogart Cup Champions and eventual tournament runner-up, the Nepean Raiders.

In Fall 2013, the Kanata Stallions announced they would be rebranded under a new ownership group. On January 5, 2014 the team tweeted that they will officially be rebranded as the Kanata Lasers, changing their Twitter handle and image. The club also announced new uniforms were in the works as part of the rebranding. At the end of the 2013-14 season, it was announced that Adam Dewan would return as head coach in the 2014-15 season.

The Kanata Lasers have been at the talk of relocation (even before the Ottawa Canadians of the CCHL2 moved to the Jack Charron Arena nearby). Kanata's destination for relocation has been Renfrew, Stittsville, and other communities in the Ottawa Valley.

On February 25, 2020 The Central Canada Hockey League approved the sale and transfer of the Kanata Lasers Junior A Hockey Club to new owners, who plan to relocate the team to Renfrew for the 2020-21 season. The new team will be known as the Renfrew Wolves.

Season-by-season record
Note: GP = Games Played, W = Wins, L = Losses, T = Ties, OTL = Overtime Losses, GF = Goals for, GA = Goals against

Fred Page Cup 
Eastern Canada Championships
MHL - QAAAJHL - CCHL - Host
Round robin play with 2nd vs 3rd in semi-final to advance against 1st in the finals.

Royal Bank Cup
CANADIAN NATIONAL CHAMPIONSHIPS
Dudley Hewitt Champions - Central, Fred Page Champions - Eastern, Western Canada Cup Champions - Western, Western Canada Cup - Runners Up and Host
Round robin play with top 4 in semi-final and winners to finals.

Championships
CJHL Bogart Cup Championships: 1992, 1997
Eastern Canadian Fred Page Cup Championships: 1997
CJAHL Royal Bank Cup Championships: None

Notable alumni
Shean Donovan
Kent Huskins
Ryan Jardine
Pat Kavanagh
Marc Methot
Sean O'Donnell
Brad Ralph
Todd White
Jimmy Howard
Patrick Sharp
Cory Murphy
Jack Quinn

External links
Kanata Lasers Webpage

Central Canada Hockey League teams
Ice hockey teams in Ottawa
Ice hockey clubs established in 1987
1987 establishments in Ontario